Feizor is a hamlet in the Yorkshire Dales National Park, England. The name means "Fech's summer pasture" probably in reference to a prominent local landowner whose name was recorded at the time of the Norman conquest.

Village

Feizor is noted for its beautiful limestone scenery. The hamlet lies near the limestone escarpments of Pot Scar, Smearsett Scar, and Giggleswick Scar on the South Craven Fault. The area offers good walking. The village offers walkers a bed-and-breakfast and a tearoom. Since 2015 Settle Falconry has been based from Elaine's Tearoom, offering hands-on Falconry Experiences from there.

References

External links
 Wainwright Wanderings
 Feizor on LocalMouth

Villages in North Yorkshire